The Banana Splits Movie is a 2019 American comedy horror film directed by Danishka Esterhazy from a screenplay written by Jed Elinoff and Scott Thomas. Serving as a horror reimagining of Hanna-Barbera's 1968 children's television series The Banana Splits, the film stars Dani Kind, Steve Lund, Celina Martin, Finlay Wotjak-Hissong, Sara Canning, Romeo Carere, and Maria Nash, with Eric Bauza as the voice of the Banana Splits. It follows a family attending a live taping of the aforementioned show and trying to survive when the titular characters go haywire upon learning of their upcoming cancellation, starting a killing spree around the studio.

The project was first announced in February 2019, following an original idea from Josh Van Houdt, Syfy's vice president of development, about turning a discussed Banana Splits film adaptation into a horror film. Esterhazy was hired as director with screenwriters Elinoff and Thomas having conceived the idea based on inspiration from 1986's Chopping Mall and 1988's Child's Play. Prior to its release, the film received a small cult following due to comparisons with the Five Nights at Freddy's franchise.

The Banana Splits Movie premiered at the San Diego Comic-Con on July 18, 2019, and was released through video on demand on August 13, 2019 by Warner Bros. Home Entertainment. The film received mixed to positive reviews from critics, with praise for the performances and concept.

Plot 
Harley Williams is a huge fan of The Banana Splits, a successful children's television series featuring four animatronic characters —Fleegle the Beagle, Bingo the Orangutan, Drooper the Lion, and Snorky the Elephant— along with their human co-star Stevie. As a surprise birthday present, his parents Beth and Mitch take him with his step-brother Austin and his classmate Zoe to a live taping of the show at Taft Studios. Upon arrival, the family meet several audience and staff members, including show hostess Paige and her assistant Doug, fan couple Thadd and Poppy, aspiring young performer Parker with her father Jonathan, and security guard Sal.

As the taping is getting ready, the studio's new vice president of programming, Andy, informs show's producer Rebecca that he is cancelling the show after the recording as it does not go with his network's vision. The Banana Splits' new software updates malfunction after Drooper overhears this through a drunken Stevie, with Bingo and Snorky kidnapping Andy while Drooper kills Stevie by thrusting a prop lollipop down his throat. Outside, Beth learns that Mitch has been cheating on her with another woman. When she returns to the studio, Mitch finds Sal's decapitated corpse and is then chased and run over by Snorky.

Meanwhile, Poppy accepts Thadd's marriage proposal while live streaming the backstage before Fleegle arrives and murders Thadd by performing a "magic trick" on him (sawing him in half). Fleegle leaves Poppy after he hears Harley and Zoe looking for Snorky, taking them to the workshop. He traps them with Parker, who Bingo kidnapped while Drooper burnt Jonathan's face as they were searching Andy for an audition. The remaining survivors learn about the Banana Splits' carnage after finding a seriously-injured Jonathan. Paige finds all phones disconnected and the confiscated cell phones destroyed while Beth manages to subdue Bingo before she and Austin find Poppy and convince her to join them.

At the same time, Rebecca and Jonathan are forced to participate in the show's obstacle course until Fleegle stabs Jonathan to death in the back with a key while Rebecca completes the course, only for Drooper to beat her to death with a hammer. Harley, Zoe, and Parker meet the Banana Splits' creator Karl, who considers his animatronics' actions justified by the show's cancellation and conflicts over freeing the kids. Drooper brings Bingo for repair, causing Karl to get distracted enough for the kids to escape and lock him in the cell. While looking for a way out, Harley, Zoe, and Parker come across Snorky and convince him to help them.

Beth, Austin, Paige, and Poppy arrive at the workshop to ask Karl how to stop the Banana Splits but he does not provide any information. The group hear music coming from a hatch in the floor and go down. However, Poppy notices the mask of an unused fifth animatronic named "Hooty". Losing her sanity, she puts on parts of the costume and kills Karl as revenge for Thadd's death. Finding the underground passage littered with the corpses of Doug, the studio's staff, and the adult audience members, the group find Fleegle and Drooper holding all children hostage while performing gruesome variants of their acts, like burning Stevie's corpse and brutally murdering Andy by ripping his limbs off.

Snorky arrives and chains Harley, Zoe, and Parker, but secretly gives Harley the keys to free them. While Beth and Austin manage to kill both Fleegle and Drooper, Parker guides all the kids to the exit. Beth, Austin, and Harley meet up with Paige and Zoe before being cornered by Bingo. Suddenly, Snorky appears and attacks Bingo, killing him before dying from critical damage sustained during the fight. As the police and paramedics arrive to attend survivors, Austin and Paige start a relationship while Beth punches a heavily-injured and apologetic Mitch, demanding a divorce. Left behind on the parking lot, Mitch is run over again, this time being killed by a now-insane Poppy with the Banana Splits' remains in the back of the vehicle. While she drives and sings The Banana Splits theme song, Fleegle reactivates and laughs maniacally.

Cast

 Dani Kind as Beth Williams
 Steve Lund as Mitch Williams
 Finlay Wojtak-Hissong as Harley Williams
 Romeo Carere as Austin Williams
 Sara Canning as Rebecca
 Naledi Majola as Paige
 Maria Nash as Zoe
 Kiroshan Naidoo as Thadd
 Celina Martin as Poppy
 Lionel Newton as Karl
 Richard White as Stevie
 Lia Sachs as Parker
 Keeno Lee Hector as Jonathan
 Daniel Fox as Andy
 Vash Singh as Doug
 Nicky Rebelo as Sal
 Liza Scholtz as Zoe's mother
 Jenna Saras as Parker's mother

The animatronic characters' cast includes in-suit performers Terry Sauls as Fleegle, Buntu Plam as Bingo, Kori Clark as Drooper, and Brandon Vraagom as Snorky. Eric Bauza provides the voices of Fleegle, Bingo and Drooper; Snorky doesn't speak and mostly makes honking noises. Bauza also provides the voice of the show's announcer.

Production 
On February 19, 2019, Warner Bros. Television Group's Blue Ribbon Content division announced that they were collaborating with Blue Ice Pictures on producing a film adaptation of The Banana Splits television series, which would take place in a horror-like setting, scheduled to premiere at the San Diego Comic-Con on July 18, 2019, to be released direct to streaming through Warner Bros. Home Entertainment on August 12, 2019, on DVD and Blu-ray on August 27, 2019, and to air on Syfy on October 12, 2019. Danishka Esterhazy, who worked as second unit director for Syfy's Channel Zero, was hired to direct the film, based on a script written by Jed Elinoff and Scott Thomas, who created Randy Cunningham: 9th Grade Ninja and wrote for The Haunting Hour: The Series. The film was rated R by the Motion Picture Association of America for "horror violence and gore", marking it as the first film adaptation of a Hanna-Barbera or Sid and Marty Krofft property to receive this classification.

On June 13, 2019, when Syfy Wire released the official trailer for the film, some drew comparisons to the upcoming Five Nights at Freddy's film adaptation. Patrick Stumph from Fall Out Boy composed the score for the film, as well as his version of The Banana Splits theme song.

Home media 
The Banana Splits Movie made an estimated $279,000 from DVD and Blu-ray home media sales.

Reception

Critical response 

Kat Hughes of The Hollywood News praised the film and its direction, saying "Danishka Esterhazy proves the breadth of her directional range. The Banana Splits is a fun-filled, cacophony of zany deaths and characters, that plays out as Charlie and the Chocolate Factory for grown-ups". William Bibbiani of Bloody Disgusting gave a positive review saying that the film "offers a satisfying sequence of slasher slays" but that it "relies so much on cognitive disconnect that never feels like more than an ironic kill count".

Reviewer Jim Johnson, of Comic Book Resources, wrote that "it's a bold move that works, because, here in 2019, there's really nothing better to do with the Banana Splits. And it's not like anyone else had a better idea". Russ Burlingame of ComicBook.com praised the performances and script, saying "The Banana Splits Movie will be controversial — especially among those who still have a fondness for the original series — but it mostly sticks the landing, buoyed by a great cast, script and crew". Luke Thompson, writing to Forbes, says that "... until we get an actual Five Nights at Freddy's movie, this does deliver in that unique niche of furry animal animatronics gone scary".

Ben Kenigsberg of The New York Times gave the film a negative review, writing that it is "far less crazy than it wants to be and far more soporific than a synopsis would suggest". Mike MGranaghan of Aisle Seat gave the film 2 out of 4 stars, writing "When it's doing what it's supposed to do, The Banana Splits Movie has some definite novelty, value. Unfortunately, that's only about 50% of the time, tops".

Notes

See also 
 The Banana Splits in Hocus Pocus Park, another film based on the Banana Splits.
 Willy's Wonderland, a similar horror film with murderous animatronics.
 Winnie-the-Pooh: Blood and Honey, a similar horror film also based on a children's franchise.
 The Mean One, a similar horror film also based on a children's franchise.
 Arthur, malédiction, a similar horror film also based on a children's franchise
 Five Nights at Freddy's, a video game with a similar premise.

References

External links

 
 

The Banana Splits
2019 films
2019 comedy horror films
2019 direct-to-video films
2019 science fiction films
2010s American films
2010s English-language films
2010s parody films
2010s satirical films
2010s science fiction comedy films
2010s science fiction horror films
2010s slasher films
American comedy horror films
American films about revenge
American parody films
American robot films
American satirical films
American slasher films
American splatter films
Blue Ribbon Content films
Direct-to-video comedy films
Direct-to-video horror films
Film controversies in the United States
Films about adultery in the United States
Films about apes
Films about death
Films about dogs
Films about elephants
Films about lions
Films based on television series
Obscenity controversies in film
Parodies of horror
Puppet films
Rating controversies in film
Slasher comedy films
Warner Bros. direct-to-video films
Horror films based on children's franchises